Ignacio "Nacho" Pastor Alemañ (born 3 April 2000) is a Spanish footballer who plays as a central defender for SD Huesca B.

Club career
Born in Elche, Alicante, Valencian Community, Pastor joined Elche CF's youth setup in 2011, from SCD Intangco. Promoted to the reserves in July 2019, he made his senior debut on 25 August by starting in a 1–1 Tercera División home draw against Atzeneta UE.

Pastor made his first team debut on 11 January 2020, playing the full 90 minutes in a 2–1 away defeat of Yeclano Deportivo, for the season's Copa del Rey. His professional debut occurred eleven days later, as he started in a 1–1 home draw against Athletic Bilbao, with his side being knocked out in the penalty shoot-outs.

On 5 October 2020, Pastor was loaned to Segunda División B side CF Lorca Deportiva for one year, but moved to fellow league team SD Tarazona the following 8 January, also in a temporary deal. On 13 August 2021, he moved to SD Huesca and was assigned to the B-team in Segunda División RFEF.

References

External links

2000 births
Living people
Footballers from Elche
Spanish footballers
Association football defenders
Segunda División B players
Tercera División players
Elche CF Ilicitano footballers
Elche CF players
SD Tarazona footballers
SD Huesca B players